Robert Allen Boyer (September 30, 1909 in Toledo, Ohio – November 11, 1989 in Dunedin, Florida) was a chemist employed by Henry Ford. Boyer was proficient at inventing ways to convert soybeans into paints and plastic parts used on Ford automobiles. 

Born on September 30th, 1909 in Toledo, Ohio, Robert Boyers father was hired by Henry Ford to run the nation's oldest hotel, the Wayside Inn, in South Sudbury, Massachusetts. Ford met Boyer at one of his frequent visits to the inn.  Ford claimed that Boyer had a “keen active mind” and was asked by Ford to enroll in the new Henry Ford Trade School and participate in its unique work-study program instead of following his plans to enter Andover prep school and then Dartmouth College. Boyer excelled in the Ford Trade School and took to exploring concepts such as how to manufacture synthetic wool from soybeans. These were the types of problems that stumped the experts.  

Boyer graduated from the Ford Trade School at the age of 21 with a promising chemistry career in front of him and began his career as the head of the soybean lab at the Edison Institute. Here Boyer’s career took off.  He started working to use soybeans in ways they had never been used before.  Boyer did things from extracting lubricating and paint oils from the soybean to creating a synthetic wool made from soybeans and pressing insulating varnish for starters and generators.  One of his first projects began in 1932 and included building “a small solvent extractor to separate the bean into soy oil and protein-rich meal”. The soybean oil became the most crucial commercial soy products on Ford cars. 

In 1934 the five to eight coats of lacquer that cars previously had been finished with was replaced with a synthetic baked enamel paint which contained about 35% soy oil.  This new synthetic paint with soy oil saved considerable time and money.  

In 1937, Boyer developed a curved plastic sheet which he hoped would replace steel in the auto bodies of ford cars. He demonstrated his confidence in his product that by hitting it with an axe in the middle of a crowd of reporters and critics. He also jumped up and down on the curved sheet.  When there was no bending in the sheet and no shattering due to the axe and the weight of him jumping on the sheet, people were astounded. This soy protein plastic sheet consist of 70% cellulose and 30% resin binder pressed into cloth.  “The new rust-free, dent-proof plastic was reportedly 50% lighter and 50% cheaper to produce than steel”. This new plastic body cut the total weight of the car from 3,000 lb. to 2,000. The sheets look like polished steel and can be bent but just snap back into place, therefore when caught in fender benders, the fender would bounce back like “rubber balls”.  Needless to say, this product was a breakthrough in the world of automobile production.  

Boyer also used the soy isolates to produce the world's first plant protein fiber in 1938. This fiber resembled a soft wool, it was tan in color, had a medium luster and a soft warm feel. “it has 80% the strength of wool, took the same dyes, had good elongation, and did not wet as easily as wool.” Boyer figured this fiber could be used for upholstery in cars, filling in felt hats, or for clothing. Boyer changed the way the soybean was used and created innovative products used daily.

References

Further reading
 
 
 

1909 births
1989 deaths
20th-century American chemists
Ford people